Maria Nowakowska (born 14 March 1987) is a student from Legnica, Poland who was crowned Miss Polonia 2009.  She was Poland's representative at Miss Universe 2010.

References

1987 births
Living people
Miss Universe 2010 contestants
Polish beauty pageant winners
People from Legnica
Miss Polonia winners